Kim Ga-yeon (born Kim So-yeon, 9 September 1972) is a South Korean actress and former owner of the StarCraft II team SlayerS.

Personal life 
In 2011, Kim entered into a common-law marriage with South Korean former professional StarCraft player Lim Yo-hwan, which was kept secret for two years. They had a daughter, born on 1 August 2015.
In 2016, she and Lim Yo-Hwan had a wedding.

Filmography

Television series

Awards and nominations

References

External links
 

1972 births
Living people
Esports team owners
South Korean film actresses
South Korean television actresses
South Korean television personalities
Hanyang University alumni
South Korean Buddhists
Women in esports